Stefan Clessin (13 November 1833, Würzburg – 21 December 1911, Regensburg) was a German malacologist.

He served as a military officer, and from 1862 worked for the Bavarian railways. He was an editor of the Malakozoologische Blätter and made major contributions to Martini and Chemitz' Systematisches Conchylien-Cabinet. He conducted research of fossil mollusks as well as living species.

Bibliography 
 Die mollusken-fauna der umgegend von Augsburg (1871); Bericht des Naturhistorischen vereins in Augsburg, bd. XXI.
 Ueber Missbildungen der Mollusken und ihrer Gehäuse, (1873); Bericht of the Naturhistorischer Verein in Augsburg, 22.
 Deutsche excursions-mollusken-fauna, (1876), Nurnberg : Bauer & Raspe.
 Clessin S. (1880). "Studien über die Familie der Paludinen". Malakozoologische Blätter (ser. 2)2: 161-196.
 Die Molluskenfauna Oesterreich-Ungarns und der Schweiz, (5 parts, 1887–90), Nürnberg : Bauer & Raspe.

Taxa described 
Clessin named more than 90 species of non-marine gastropod mollusks, including:
 Bythiospeum pfeifferi (Clessin, 1890)
 Bythiospeum tschapecki (Clessin, 1882)

References

Borcherding, F.,1912 Stephan Clessin.Nekrolog Nachrichtsblatt der deutschen Malakozoologischen Gesellschaft 24(2): 49-151. Biography,portrait, bibliography 
Boeters, H. D.,1967 Die Publikationsdaten der Clessin's  Molluskenfaunen. Mitteilungen der Deutschen Malakozoologischen Gesellschaft 10: 210-212. Bibliography 
Jungbluth, J. H.,1995  Zur Geschichte der deutschen Malakozoologie, XXI: Die Deutsche Malakozoologische Gesellschaft - vom 19. Jahrhundert in das 21. Jahrhundert. 1868-1993: 125 Jahre Deutsche Malakozoologische Gesellschaft. Mitteilungen der Deutschen Malakozoologischen Gesellschaft, 55: 1-18.  Biography
Naturforscher im Landkreis Augsburg Von Heinz Fischer, Augsburg  24. Bericht der Naturf.Ges.Augsbg/ Seite 131 - 157 / 3. Nov. 1970 135-pdf in German includes portrait.

1833 births
1911 deaths
German malacologists
Scientists from Würzburg